Stewart River may refer to:

Stewart River (Queensland), a river located in Far North Queensland, Australia
Stewart River (Yukon), a river located in the Yukon Territory, Canada
Stewart River (Minnesota), a river located in Minnesota, United States

See also
Stuart River (disambiguation)